John Ash may refer to:
 John Ash (physician) (1723–1798), British physician
 John Ash (divine) (c. 1724–1779), lexicographer and minister
 John Ash (Canadian politician) (1821–1886), Member of the Legislative Assembly for Comox riding in British Columbia, Canada
 John Ash (ornithologist) (1925–2014), British ornithologist
 John Ash (writer) (1948–2019), poet, writer and travel writer
 John Ash (MP for Totnes) (fl. 1420–1439), English politician

See also
John Ashe (disambiguation)
Ash (disambiguation)
Ash (name)